Jelínek (feminine Jelínková) is a Czech surname that means "little deer". Notable people include:

Antonín Jelínek, Czech wrestler
Arthur J. Jelinek (1928 – 2022), American anthropologist specializing in the Eurasian paleolithic
Bohumil Jelínek, Czech footballer
David Jelínek (born 1990), Czech basketball player
Dora Jelínková, Czech volleyball player
Ellen Marianne Mattson Jelinek (born 1973), Swedish actress
Eloise Jelinek (1924–2007), American linguist
Elfriede Jelinek (born 1946), Austrian writer
František Cína Jelínek, Czech painter
Frederick Jelinek (1932–2010), American information theorist
Hanns Jelinek (1901–1969), Austrian composer
Jan Jelinek (born 1949), German musician
Jan Jelínek (legionary) (1893–1974), Czech writer
Jiří Jelínek (ballet dancer) (born 1977), Czech ballet dancer
Jiří Jelínek (trumpeter) (1922–1984), Czech musician
Josef Jelínek (born 1941), Czech football player
Joseph R. Jelinek (1919–1978), American general
Karina Jelinek (born 1981), Argentine model and actress
Karl Jelinek, Austrian physicist and meteorologist
Maria Jelinek (born 1942), Canadian skater
Mariann Jelinek (born 1942), American organizational theorist
Mercedes Jelinek (born 1985), American photographer
Milena Jelinek (1935–2020), Czech-American writer
Otto Jelinek (born 1940), Canadian skater and diplomat
Pavel Jelínek (born 1972), Czech physicist
Petr Jelínek (born 1984), Czech ice hockey player
Robert Jelinek (born 1969), Swedish actor
Ron Jelinek (born 1945), American politician
Šárka Jelínková, Czech politician
Tomáš Jelínek, Czech ice hockey player
W. Craig Jelinek (born 1952), American businessman
Václav Jelínek (born 1944), a Czechoslovak spy, who worked in London under the assumed identity of Erwin van Haarlem
Vladislav Jelínek, Czech footballer
Wilhelm Jelinek, Austrian handball player
Žuži Jelinek (1920–2016), Croatian writer

See also
Jellinek

Czech-language surnames
Jewish surnames